W.A.K.O. European Championships 1978 was the second European kickboxing championships hosted by the W.A.K.O. organization and organized by the pioneer of German karate Georg Brueckner.  The 1978 W.A.K.O. European championships were open to amateur men based in Europe only, with each country allowed more than one competitor in an individual weight category.  The event also heralded a new category, Semi-Contact, which was introduced to feature alongside the existing Full-Contact category.  At the championships end, West Germany was by far the most successful nation, with the previous year's top nation, the Netherlands, finishing way behind in second, and Italy came third - more detail on the winners and medal tables can be found in the sections below.  The event was held in May 1978 in the border town of Wolfsburg, West Germany.

Men's Full-Contact Kickboxing

As with the previous years championships, the 1978 European Championships Full-Contact kickboxing category had seven weight divisions for men only, with all bouts fought under Full-Contact kickboxing rules.  More detail on Full-Contact's rules-set can be found at the W.A.K.O. website, although be aware that the rules have changed since 1978.  The weight divisions on offer ranged from 57 kg/125.4 lbs to over 87 kg/191.4 lbs - with the heaviest division having a slight minimum increase of 3 kg on the 1977 championships.  The medal winners of each division are shown below with the host West Germany being by far the most dominant nation in Full-Contact, winning five gold, four silver and two bronze medals.

Men's Full-Contact Kickboxing Medals Table

Men's Semi-Contact Kickboxing

The 1978 European Championships saw the introduction of a second category, Semi-Contact, a form of kickboxing which differed from Full-Contact in that competitors were not allowed to use excessive force and won fights instead by relying on speed, skill and technique to score points - more detail on Semi-Contact rules can be found on the W.A.K.O. website, although be aware that much has changed since 1978.  As with Full-Contact there were seven weight divisions at the championships for men only, ranging from 57 kg (125.4 lbs) to over 84 kg (184.8 lbs).  The medal winners of each division are shown below with West Germany being the strongest nation in Semi-Contact, winning five gold, three silver and two bronze medals.

Men's Semi-Contact Kickboxing Medals Table

Overall Medals Standing (Top 5)

See also
List of WAKO Amateur European Championships
List of WAKO Amateur World Championships

References

External links
 WAKO World Association of Kickboxing Organizations Official Site

WAKO Amateur European Championships events
Kickboxing in Germany
1978 in kickboxing